30 Seconds may refer to:

 30 Seconds (game), a general-knowledge board game
 30 Seconds (TV series), an Australian comedy series
 "30 Seconds" (Alias), a television episode
 "30 Seconds", a song by Tracy Bonham from The Burdens of Being Upright

See also